The 2010 Sacred Heart Pioneers football team represented Sacred Heart University in the 2010 NCAA Division I FCS football season. They were led by seventh year head coach Paul Gorham and played their home games at Campus Field. They were a member of the Northeast Conference (NEC), and they finished the season 4–7, 2–6 in NEC play.

Schedule
*Schedule Source:

References

Sacred Heart
Sacred Heart Pioneers football seasons
Sacred Heart Pioneers football